Tal: His Marvelous Adventures with Noom-Zor-Noom is a children's fantasy novel by Paul Fenimore Cooper, illustrated by Ruth Reeves, and published by William Morrow in 1929. New editions were published in 1957 by Stephen Daye Press and in 2001 by Purple House Press. The story features an orphan who goes on a quest to the land of Troom with a wise storyteller, Noom-Zor-Noom, and his talking donkey.

Plot summary
A man and his talking donkey take a young boy, Tal, on an adventure. The man has been chosen to tell a story on an occasion of great importance and it must be the very best story possible. The man has chosen Tal to travel with him, thinking that the boy will be able to help him choose the right story. Each day they travel through different lands and meet new characters, and each night the man shares a new story with Tal. He is expecting that, by journey's end, Tal will choose the best story.

Reception
Tal has been compared favorably to The Wizard of Oz and also has a journey plot.

Noom-Zor-Noom's stories 
The book contains numerous stories that Noom-Zor-Noom tells on their way to Troom. 
 "The Enchanted Tapestry"
 "The Turtle"
 "The Cloud"
 "The Green Horse"
 "Millitinkle"
 "The Music Box"
 "Trumbilloo the Magician"
 "Sar, Nar, and Jinook"
 "The Cobbler"
 "Bantagooma"
 "Tarrandar's Secret"
 "The Toy Maker"
 "The Four Winds"
 "The Great Giant Bunggah"

Main characters
 Tal
 Noom-Zor-Noom
 Millitinkle

Minor characters
 King Tazzarin of Troom
 The Mellikanoo
 The Wimzies
 The Elephant Ferryman

Storytellers in Troom
 Repper-Tep-Tep
 Brah
 Akadon
 Punda-Poo
 Noom-Zor-Noom

Locations
 Martoona
 Troom

References

External links
 TAL at Purple House Press (80th Anniversary Edition, 2009)

1929 American novels
American fantasy novels
Novels about orphans